The Crescent Dunes Solar Energy Project is a solar thermal power project with an installed capacity of 110 megawatt (MW) and 1.1 gigawatt-hours of energy storage located near Tonopah, about  northwest of Las Vegas.
Crescent Dunes is the first commercial concentrated solar power (CSP) plant with a central receiver tower and advanced molten salt energy storage technology, following the experimental Solar Two.

Startup energy venture company SolarReserve, created via seed funding US Renewables Group and United Technologies, was the original owner of Tonopah Solar Energy LLC, the owner and operator of the Crescent Dunes plant.  The Crescent Dunes project was subsequently backed by a $737 million in U.S. government loan guarantees and by Tonopah partnering with Cobra Thermosolar Plants, Inc.  The overall venture had a projected cost of less than $1 billion.
The plant suffered several design, construction and technical problems and, having not produced power since April 2019, its sole customer, NV Energy, subsequently terminated their contract. Bloomberg reported that NV Energy wasn’t allowed to sever its agreement with the plant until after the DoE took over the shuttered plant in August 2019.

Since the initial failure of the Crescent Dunes project, SolarReserve took down their website and is believed to have permanently ceased operations.  Upon the developer's silence as the involved parties sought legal recourse, the plant's exact status was publicly unknown for some time and was left to conjecture.

While proceeding through its subsequent bankruptcy proceedings, Tonopah Solar Energy stated that it had hopes for a restart of the Crescent Dunes plant by the end of 2020. According to court documents, Tonopah is owned by SolarReserve, Cobra Energy Investment LLC, a division of Spanish construction company ACS Group and Banco Santander, S.A.  On September 11, 2020, the bankruptcy court approved Tonopah Solar Energy's disclosure statement.  On December 3, 2020 the Chapter 11 bankruptcy reorganization plan was confirmed by the court.  As one result of this plan's confirmation, Cobra now has operational control of the plant.  In July 2021, the project restarted production for NV Energy.

History
In late September 2011 Tonopah Solar Energy received a $737 million loan guarantee from the United States Department of Energy (DOE) and  the right to build on public land.  The capital stack included $170,000,000 in EB-5 investment through SolarReserve/ACS Cobra partner CMB Regional Centers.
Under a power purchase agreement (PPA) between SolarReserve and NV Energy, all power generated by the Crescent Dunes project in the next 25 years would have been sold to NV Energy for $0.135 per kilowatt-hour.

Ground was broken on the project in September 2011.
Construction terminated at the end of 2013, followed by several months of testing the plant systems. The project entered commissioning phase in February 2014 following completion of construction.
It began operation in September 2015, but went off-line in October 2016 due to a leak in a molten salt tank. The owners warned the EPC about flaws in the salt tank foundations (and other matters) with formal comments lodged on the record in March 2012 progress meeting with DOE and its engineer present (the lender did not voice any objection).
It returned to operation in July 2017.

The plant having last produced power in April 2019, NV Energy—the project's sole customer—terminated its contract in October 2019 on the basis of the project having "failed to produce."  Alleging a takeover of Tonopah Solar Energy by the DOE, SolarReserve then raised the possibility of the project filing for bankruptcy, which subsequently happened. SolarReserve also filed a lawsuit, claiming that the Department of Energy was looking to appoint two new members to Tonopah Solar Energy’s board of managers, giving the appearance of the Energy Department in complete control of Tonopah directors which comprise the entirety of the Tonopah Board of Managers.  An interim outcome in this regard was that SolarReserve took down their website and was believed to have ceased operations permanently.

Tonopah Solar Energy filed for bankruptcy on July 30, 2020.  Pending the approval of the bankruptcy court, a $200 million settlement with the remaining debtors — Tonopah Solar Energy LLC and ACS Cobra — for the return of taxpayer dollars was also announced at the end of July 2020.  The amount is less than half of what taxpayers are owed on the outstanding $425 million of public debt.  Under the settlement agreement and as a function of subsequent repairs, restoration of the plant to power production and acquisition of new long-term customers, ACS Cobra is liable for an additional $100 million in otherwise suspended debt.

Technology
The project's EPC Contractor was ACS Cobra, which carried out the engineering design, procured the equipment and materials necessary, and then constructed and delivered the facility to Tonopah Solar Energy. The molten salt circulates from the tower to a storage tank, where it is then used to produce steam and generate electricity.

Excess thermal energy is stored in the molten salt and could be used to generate power for up to ten hours, including during the evening hours and when direct sunlight is not available. The storage technology thus eliminated the need for any backup fossil fuels, such as natural gas. Once melted, the salt stays melted for the life of the plant and is cycled through the receiver for reheating.

Production 
Crescent Dunes began operation in September 2015, but went off-line in October 2016 due to a leak in a molten salt tank. It returned to operation in July 2017. While its average monthly production was expected to exceed 40,000 MWh, as of May 2019 it never reached that value and only exceeded half of it during 9 months.

The commissioning of a new thermal plant requires up to four years to achieve 100% operating level, from the first grid connection to full production. As an example the Edwardsport production data, whose progression, skipping first partial year, is a 40% output the first full year, 57% the second full year, the next year the progression was stopped by a problem in October, but resumes with a 73% the fourth and next year. At Crescent Dunes, it was to be expected a similar progression, but the failure of the storage tanks in 2016, froze the commissioning. Following that, first full production year was delayed to 2018, starting with a 40% (200 over 500) output.

Shutdown

The first three months of 2019 (January, February and March) showed good progression, topping all previous monthly data, but in April the plant was shut down because the project's sole buyer, NV Energy, terminated the Power Purchase Agreement for failure to produce the contracted power production. The power generated also cost NV Energy about $135 per megawatt-hour, compared with less than $30 per MWh available from a new Nevada photovoltaic solar farm. But to compare fairly, it must be taken into account that the Tonopah solar project power is dispatchable whilst photovoltaic power is intermittent.  Truly levelized cost comparisons must include the capacity payments for generating capacity available to supply power during peak hours.  By doing so, low-to-high hourly wholesale electricity prices have been shown to vary by up to four orders of magnitude.

In July 2021, the project restarted production.

Gallery

See also

 List of solar thermal power stations
 Renewable energy in the United States
 Solar thermal energy

Notes

External links 

Solar thermal energy
Solar power stations in Nevada
Buildings and structures in Nye County, Nevada
Energy infrastructure completed in 2016
2016 in Nevada